The Länderbahnen (singular: Länderbahn) were the various state railways of the German Confederation and the German Empire in the period from about 1840 to 1920, when they were merged into the Deutsche Reichsbahn after the First World War.

The state railways

Railways merged into the Deutsche Reichsbahn
The seven state railways forming the merger were the:

Prussian state railways (Preußische Staatseisenbahnen or P.St.E.) 
Royal Bavarian State Railways (Königlich Bayerische Staatseisenbahn or K.Bay.Sts.B.)
Royal Saxon State Railways (Königlich Sächsische Staatseisenbahnen or K.Sächs.Sts.E.B.)
Royal Württemberg State Railways (Königlich Württembergische Staatseisenbahn or K.W.St.E.)
Grand Duchy of Baden State Railways (Großherzoglich Badische Staatseisenbahn or G.Bad.St.E.), 1840–1920
Grand Duchy of Mecklenburg Friedrich-Franz Railway (Großherzoglich Mecklenburgische Friedrich-Franz-Eisenbahn or M.F.F.E.)
Grand Duchy of Oldenburg State Railways (Großherzoglich Oldenburgische Staatseisenbahn or G.O.E.), 1867–1920

Other state railways
Other state railways that existed during this period, but which later folded or were absorbed, included the:

 Royal Hanoverian State Railways (Königlich Hannöversche Staatseisenbahnen or K.H.St.B.), merged with Royal Prussian State Railways (Königlich Preußische Staatseisenbahnen or K.P.St.E.) in 1866
 Nassau State Railway (Herzoglich Nassauische Staatsbahn or H.N.St.B.), merged with the K.P.St.E. in 1866
 Bebra-Hanau Railway (Bebra-Hanauer Eisenbahn), a Kurhessian state railway, merged with the K.P.St.E. in 1866
 Duchy of Brunswick State Railway (Herzoglich Braunschweigische Staatseisenbahn), merged with the K.P.St.E. in 1870
 Anhalt Leopold Railway (Anhaltische Leopoldsbahn), merged with the K.P.St.E. in 1882
 Grand Duchy of Hesse State Railways (Großherzoglich Hessischen Staatseisenbahnen or G.H.St.E.), merged with the K.P.St.E. in 1897 to form the Royal Prussian and Grand Duchy of Hesse State Railway (Königlich Preußische und Großherzoglich Hessischen Staatseisenbahnen or K.P.u.G.H.St.E.)
 Imperial Railways in Alsace-Lorraine (Reichseisenbahn Elsaß-Lothringen), lost to France after the First World War

KPEV
The so-called Royal Prussian Railway Administration or KPEV did not exist, although some of the rolling stock carried 'KPEV' emblems and the abbreviation is commonly used in railway circles nowadays.

See also
 History of rail transport in Germany

Sources

 German Wikipedia article on the "History of the Railway in Germany"

History of rail transport in Germany
Defunct railway companies of Germany